The Canterbury Caledonian Society Pipe Band is a grade one pipe band based in Christchurch, New Zealand.

The band's Pipe Major is Jamie Hawke; lead drummer is Michael Jenkins.

References

External links
Band website

Grade 1 pipe bands